Hanggang Makita Kang Muli (International title: Until We Meet Again / ) is a 2016 Philippine television drama series broadcast by GMA Network. Directed by Laurice Guillen, it stars Bea Binene. It premiered on March 7, 2016 on the network's Afternoon Prime line up replacing Buena Familia. The series concluded on July 15, 2016 with a total of 93 episodes. It was replaced by Sinungaling Mong Puso in its timeslot.

The series is streaming online on YouTube.

Premise
Due to Odessa's obsession with Larry, she will destroy Larry's relationship with Evelyn. Odessa will kidnap their child and lock the child in an abandoned warehouse. The kid, Ana will grow up with a dog causing her to act like an animal. Eventually Ana will escape from the warehouse and meet Calvin.

Cast and characters

Lead cast
 Bea Binene as Ana Isabelle E. Medrano / Angela

Supporting cast
 Derrick Monasterio as Calvin Manahan
 Raymart Santiago as Larry Medrano
 Angelika Dela Cruz as Evelyn Esguerra-Medrano 
 Ina Feleo as Odessa Luna / Margaret
 Kim Rodriguez as Claire Esguerra
 Rita Avila as Glenda Manahan
 Ramon Christopher Gutierrez as Francisco "Francis" Manahan
 Luz Valdez as Conching Luna
 Marco Alcaraz as Dominic Reyes
 Jak Roberto as Elmo Manahan-Villamor
 Shyr Valdez as Helen Esguerra-Borja

Recurring cast
 Frank Magalona as Bernard Vivas
 Elle Ramirez as Charmaine "Charm" Alvarez
 Coleen Perez as Myla
 Allan Paule as Lando Sandoval
 Dexter Doria as Yolanda
 Kevin Sagra as Jomar
 Avery Paraiso as Marlon Santos
 Kyle Vergara as Louie del Castillo
 Shermaine Santiago as Jelly

Guest cast
 Ar Angel Aviles as young Odessa
 Jayzelle Suan as young Ana
 Lawrence Marasigan as young Calvin
 Thom Brickman as John

Ratings
According to AGB Nielsen Philippines' Mega Manila household television ratings, the pilot episode of Hanggang Makita Kang Muli earned a 13.8% rating. While the final episode scored an 18.9% rating.

References

External links
 
 

2016 Philippine television series debuts
2016 Philippine television series endings
Fantaserye and telefantasya
Filipino-language television shows
GMA Network drama series
Television shows set in the Philippines
Television shows set in San Francisco